From the Screen to Your Stereo Part II is a cover album by American band New Found Glory, and is the follow-up from the 2000 EP From the Screen to Your Stereo. All the tracks are covers of songs from motion picture soundtracks. In 2019, the band released another album in the series, From the Screen to Your Stereo 3, under the Hopeless label.

Release
From late June to late August, the band went on the Warped Tour, and played at the Reading and Leeds Festivals in the UK. On August 10, 2007, a cover of the Goo Goo Dolls song "Iris" was posted on the group's Myspace account. On August 17, 2007, a cover of the Sixpence None the Richer song "Kiss Me" was also posted on their Myspace. On August 24, a cover of the Tears for Fears song "Head over Heels" was made available for streaming via Alternative Press. Five days later, a cover of the Madonna song "Crazy for You" was posted online. The music video for "Kiss Me" was posted online on September 5, 2007; a cover of the Go West song "King of Wishful Thinking" premiered through AbsolutePunk four days later.

From the Screen to Your Stereo Part II was made available for streaming through their Myspace on September 14, 2007, and was released through Drive-Thru Records four days later. On the same day, "Kiss Me" was released to radio. In October and November, the band went on a co-headlining tour of the U.S. with Senses Fail. They were supported by Set Your Goals and The Receiving End of Sirens. The band joined Paramore on their tour of the UK in January and February 2008.

Track listing

Release history

Credits
Band
 Jordan Pundik – Vocals
 Chad Gilbert – Guitar
 Steve Klein – Guitar
 Ian Grushka – Bass
 Cyrus Bolooki – Drums / Percussion
Additional Musicians
 Michael Bethancourt – Keyboards
Guest Appearances
 Max Bemis – Vocals ("Crazy for You")
 Adam Lazzara – Vocals ("Lovefool")
 Lisa Loeb – Vocals ("Stay")
 Chris Carrabba – Vocals ("The Promise")
 Patrick Stump – Vocals ("The King of Wishful Thinking")
 Will Pugh – Vocals ("Iris")
 Sherri DuPree – Vocals ("It Ain't Me Babe")
 Stacy DuPree - Vocals ("Lovefool")
Production
 Paul Miner – Engineer, Audio Mixing
 Ted Jensen – Mastering
 Richard Reines – Executive Producer, A&R
 Stefanie Reines – Executive Producer, A&R
 Kristine Ripley – Project Coordinator, A&R
 Kelly Scott Orr – Art Direction, Design, Graphic Design
 Boyd Dupree – Photography

References

External links

From the Screen to Your Stereo Part II at YouTube (streamed copy where licensed)

2007 albums
New Found Glory albums
Covers albums
Drive-Thru Records albums
Sequel albums